Taner Demirbaş (born 20 November 1978) is a Turkish professional footballer who last played as a forward for Adiyamanspor. Demirbaş played for several clubs in Turkey, mostly in the second or third tiers of the league system.

Career statistics
.

References

1978 births
Living people
Turkish footballers
Bursaspor footballers
Adıyamanspor footballers
Adana Demirspor footballers
Mersin İdman Yurdu footballers
Kayseri Erciyesspor footballers
Malatyaspor footballers
Sakaryaspor footballers
Alanyaspor footballers
Elazığspor footballers
Turkey youth international footballers
People from Araklı
Association football forwards